The following highways are numbered 671:

Philippines
 N671 highway (Philippines)

United States

Other places